This is a list of rural localities in Karachay-Cherkessia. Karachay-Cherkessia (Karachayevo-Cherkesskaya Respublika; Karachay-Balkar: Къарачай-Черкес Республика, Qaraçay-Çerkes Respublika; Kabardian: Къэрэшей-Шэрджэс Республикэ, Ķêrêšei-Šêrdžês Respublikê, Nogai: Қарашай-Шеркес Республикасы, Qaraşay-Şerkes Respublikası) or Karachay-Cherkessia (Karachayevo-Cherkesiya) is a federal subject (a republic) of Russia. It is geographically located in the North Caucasus region of Southern Russia and is administratively part of the North Caucasian Federal District. Karachay-Cherkessia has a population of 477,859 (2010 Census).

Abazinsky District 
Rural localities in Abazinsky District:

 Inzhich-Chukun
 Psyzh

Adyge-Khablsky District 
Rural localities in Adyge-Khablsky District:

 Abaza Khabl
 Adyge-Khabl

Khabezsky District 
Rural localities in Khabezsky District:

 Abazakt
 Khabez

Malokarachayevsky District 
Rural localities in Malokarachayevsky District:

 Uchkeken

Nogaysky District, Karachay-Cherkess Republic 
Rural localities in Nogaysky District, Karachay-Cherkess Republic:

 Erken-Shakhar

Prikubansky District, Karachay-Cherkess Republic 
Rural localities in Prikubansky District, Karachay-Cherkess Republic:

 Kavkazsky

Urupsky District 
Rural localities in Urupsky District:

 Pregradnaya

Zelenchuksky District 
Rural localities in Zelenchuksky District:

 Arkhyz
 Zelenchukskaya

See also 
 
 Lists of rural localities in Russia

References 

Karachay-Cherkessia